Kedarnath Glacier is located in Garhwal Himalaya mountain ranges, in the state of Uttarakhand, India.

External links
 Youtube Kedarnath

References 

Glaciers of Uttarakhand